Lawrence Pillers (born November 4, 1952) is a former American football defensive end who played for the New York Jets, the San Francisco 49ers and the Atlanta Falcons in a ten-year career that lasted from 1976 to 1985 in the National Football League.

Pillers played college football at Alcorn State University and was drafted in the eleven round of the 1976 NFL Draft by the Jets. He was a member of the San Francisco 49ers' Super Bowl XVI and Super Bowl XIX winning teams.

Pillers made a game-saving play in the 1981 NFC Championship Game against the Dallas Cowboys.  After Dwight Clark made "The Catch" to give the 49ers a 28-27 lead in the final minute, Dallas drove into 49ers territory trying to set up a game-winning field goal.  Pillers sacked Danny White, forcing White to fumble, and the 49ers recovered to preserve the win.

1952 births
Living people
People from Hazlehurst, Mississippi
American football defensive ends
Alcorn State Braves football players
New York Jets players
San Francisco 49ers players
Atlanta Falcons players
African-American players of American football
Players of American football from Mississippi
21st-century African-American people
20th-century African-American sportspeople